9 (originally announced under the working title Wild Love) is the debut studio album by Norwegian DJ and record producer Cashmere Cat, released on 28 April 2017, by Mad Love Records and Interscope Records.

Background
In 2012, Cashmere Cat released his debut extended play (EP) Mirror Maru, followed by Wedding Bells two years later. During that time, he gained significant coverage and fellow musician Benny Blanco invited him to Los Angeles in January 2013 to collaborate on production and gave him his first concerts in the United States. The former EP's title track was also featured on the soundtrack to Grand Theft Auto V in 2013.

After producing for other artists such as Kanye West, The Weeknd and Ariana Grande, on 26 February 2016, Cashmere announced that he was working on his untitled debut studio album. On August 24, "Wild Love" was previewed on The Weeknd's Instagram profile. Upon the song's release two days later, Cat unveiled the album's original artwork and confirmed that the album would be titled after the song "Wild Love". However, on 10 April 2017, Cashmere officially renamed the album 9, reflecting the song "9 (After Coachella)", and that production was completed. The official tracklist and release date was revealed on Cashmere's Twitter on April 19.

Promotion

Singles
On 26 August 2016, "Wild Love" was released as the lead single from the album. The second single, "Trust Nobody", was released on 29 September. "Love Incredible" followed on 16 February 2017 as the third single. "9 (After Coachella)" was released on 30 March as the fourth single.

"Throw Myself a Party" was originally released as a single in promotion of the album, but did not make the official track listing.

On 27 April 2017, "Quit" was released as the fifth single, the song features Ariana Grande. A lyric video was released on the same day.

Tour
On 4 April, Cashmere uploaded a video on Twitter showcasing dates for a tour entitled the 'Cat Tour'.

Artwork
On 24 August, Cashmere revealed the original artwork for 9, back then titled Wild Love, on Twitter. It showed a silhouette of a person walking across a snowed-in road with cars on the sides, while snowing. The official artwork for the album is a photo of the number '9' against a black background displayed on a computer screen.

Track listing

Charts

References

2017 debut albums
Albums produced by Cashmere Cat
Albums produced by Benny Blanco
Albums produced by Frank Dukes
Cashmere Cat albums
Albums produced by Sophie (musician)